The 2013 Men's EuroHockey Championship II was the 5th edition of the Men's EuroHockey Championship II, the second level of the men's European field hockey championships organized by the European Hockey Federation. It was held from the 3rd until the 11th of August 2013 in Vienna, Austria. 

The tournament also served as a qualifier for the 2015 EuroHockey Championship, with the finalists Russia and France qualifying.

Qualified teams

Format
The eight teams were split into two groups of four teams. The top two teams advanced to the semifinals to determine the winner in a knockout system. The bottom two teams played in a new group with the teams they did not play against in the group stage. The last two teams were relegated to the Men's EuroHockey Championship III.

Results
All times were local (UTC+2).

Preliminary round

Pool A

Pool B

Classification round

Fifth to eighth place classification
Points obtained in the preliminary round are carried over into Pool C.

Pool C

First to fourth place classification

Semi-finals

Third and fourth place

Final

Final standings

 Qualified for the 2015 EuroHockey Championship

 Relegated to the EuroHockey Championship III

See also
2013 Men's EuroHockey Championship III
2013 Men's EuroHockey Nations Championship
2013 Women's EuroHockey Championship II

References

EuroHockey Championship II
Men 2
EuroHockey Championship II Men
Sports competitions in Vienna
International field hockey competitions hosted by Austria
EuroHockey Championship II Men
2010s in Vienna